Pleasant Lake is a village in the town of Harwich in Massachusetts, USA, and is located off the Mid-Cape Highway. Most of the village is part of the census-designated place of Northwest Harwich.

Pleasant Lake is one of the least known of the Harwich villages.

References

External links
 Pleasant Lake Information 

Harwich, Massachusetts
Villages in Massachusetts
Villages in Barnstable County, Massachusetts